Thomas Forster  (1683 – October 1738), of Adderstone Hall, Northumberland,  was an English  landowner and Tory politician who sat in the House of Commons from 1708 to 1716. He served as a general of the Jacobite army in the 1715 Uprising and subsequently fled to France.

Early life
Forster was baptized on 29 March 1683,  the eldest son of Thomas Forster (1659-1725) of Adderstone,  MP for Northumberland from 1705 to 1708. His mother was Frances Forster, daughter of Sir William Forster of Bamburgh Castle. He was educated at Newcastle School, and was admitted at St John's College, Cambridge on 3 July 1700. In 1701, he inherited, with his aunt Dorothy Crew (wife of Lord Crew, Bishop of Durham)   the  estates of his uncle Ferdinando Forster, of Bamburgh and Blanchland. The estates had incurred substantial debts, and in 1704 the creditors instituted actions in Chancery to force the heirs to sell them.

Career
Forster was returned as Tory Member of Parliament (MP) for Northumberland at the 1708 British general election. In 1709 he and his aunt, sold the indebted estates to his aunt's husband, Bishop Crewe, and were left with very little of the proceeds. In 1710 he voted against the impeachment of Dr Sacheverell. At the 1710 British general election he was returned again himself for Northumberland in a contest and tried unsuccessfully to return Tory candidates at  Berwick-upon-Tweed and Morpeth.  He was listed as one of the ‘Tory patriots’ who had opposed the continuation of the war, and one of the ‘worthy patriots’ who had helped to detect the mismanagements of the previous ministry. He supported  the efforts of the Earl of Hertford and James Lowther, both Whigs, in carrying forward a bill to regulate trade on the border with Scotland.  On 18 June 1713, he voted in favour of the French commerce bill. He was returned again at the  1713 British general election but was inactive in Parliament. He was returned as MP for Northumberland at the 1715 British general election but his activities were diverted into supporting the Jacobite cause.

Jacobite rebellion and exile
The Forsters were cousins to the Radcliffes. The head of the family Lord Derwentwater, himself a cousin of the Old Pretender, was a leader of the 1715 Jacobite Rebellion. Forster met up with Lord Derwentwater in Northumberland at the head of 300 horse, and proclaimed the Pretender at Warkworth after evading arrest in London on 21 September 1715 on a charge of being ‘engaged in a design to support the intended invasion of the kingdom’. After an unsuccessful attempt on Newcastle he joined another body of rebels north of the border and a detachment from Mar's army.

Although having no military experience, Forster, as a Protestant, was elected to lead all Jacobite forces in England. Under his direction Lancelot Errington captured the island of Lindisfarne. Forster relied on advice from Henry Oxburgh, an Irish former soldier. The Jacobites moved southwest from Northumberland into Lancashire, but were faced with converging forces of the British Army under Charles Wills and George Carpenter.

In November 1715 Forster was heavily defeated at the Battle of Preston and surrendered. He was imprisoned in Newgate Prison, but escaped to France in 1716. The details of his escape and the text of the royal proclamation ordering his arrest were published by the contemporary commentator Boyer (1716). He was attainted and expelled from Parliament on 2 February 1716. Several of his former comrades including Derwentwater and Oxburgh were executed.

Forster  managed to reach Paris, where he was sent money by William Dicconson, the Pretender's treasurer. He then joined the English Jacobites at the Stuart court, where he was made steward of the Household. He had been excepted from the Act of Indemnity, and his brother John succeeded to Adderstone in 1725.  His nephew Thomas remarked, in correspondence, that he held out ‘little hopes’ of his ‘getting anything from the succession’. After the Pretender moved to Avignon from Rome he summoned Forster there in October 1727.

Death and legacy
Forster died unmarried in Boulogne, France on 27 October 1738, aged 55. His body, after being initially buried at Boulogne, was returned to England and reburied at Bamburgh on 7 December.

Physical description
Forster was described as follows in the 1716 royal proclamation ordering his arrest: A person of middle stature, inclining to be fat, well shaped except that he has stoops in the shoulders, fair complexioned, his mouth wide, his nose pretty large, his eyes grey, speaks the northern dialect".

Further reading
 Dorothy Forster, historical novel by Sir Walter Besant

References

External links
 Northumbrian Jacobites

1683 births
1738 deaths
British MPs 1708–1710
British MPs 1710–1713
British MPs 1713–1715
British MPs 1715–1722
English Jacobites
Escapees from England and Wales detention
History of Northumberland
Members of the Parliament of Great Britain for English constituencies
People of the Jacobite rising of 1715
High Sheriffs of Northumberland
Tory members of the Parliament of Great Britain
Expelled members of the Parliament of Great Britain
People from Northumberland